Epitaph Records is an American independent record label owned by Bad Religion guitarist Brett Gurewitz. Throughout the 1980s and 1990s, most acts signed to the label were punk and pop punk acts, while there are many post-hardcore and emo bands signed to the label as well. A large portion of the record label, known as Hellcat Records, is owned by Tim Armstrong, frontman of the punk rock band Rancid. Several sister labels also exist, such as ANTI-, Burning Heart Records, Hellcat Records, and Heart & Skull Records that have signed other types of bands.

History

Early years (1980s)
Brett Gurewitz formed Epitaph Records as a vehicle for releases by his band Bad Religion. The name had been taken from the King Crimson cold war protest song "Epitaph" from which the lyrics "Confusion will be my epitaph." had struck a chord with Brett and Greg when they were young. Its first release for the label was Bad Religion's 1981 self-titled EP, followed by their debut How Could Hell Be Any Worse?, which was also the label's first full-length release. Also released during this period was Peace thru Vandalism, an EP by The Vandals, who were the first band besides Bad Religion to sign to Epitaph. Two more Bad Religion releases followed – Into the Unknown and the EP Back to the Known – before their temporary split. After Gurewitz had cleaned up his drug issues, both Epitaph and Bad Religion were revived in 1987. In the following year, Epitaph released its first record as a proper label, which was L7's self-titled album, and it was distributed by Chameleon. Also in 1988, Bad Religion released Suffer, which was both released and distributed by Epitaph. Not only is Suffer often cited as one of the band's best by fans, but it is credited with "saving" the Southern California punk rock scene by fans and Bad Religion's contemporaries alike.

In 1989, Gurewitz signed NOFX to Epitaph. They released their debut for the label, S&M Airlines, that same year, featuring the video for its title track and the cover of Fleetwood Mac's "Go Your Own Way", which featured guest vocals by Gurewitz and Greg Graffin, also a member of Bad Religion. This was followed by Bad Religion's next two albums – No Control and Against the Grain – which sold 60,000 and 100,000 copies respectively.

Breakthrough success (1990s)
By 1993, more punk acts had signed to Epitaph, including Pennywise, Down by Law, Coffin Break, The Offspring, Rancid, RKL, SNFU, Dead Fucking Last, Total Chaos and Claw Hammer. Epitaph's expansion saw the label relocate to new offices in Silver Lake.

Although Bad Religion was the founding band of Epitaph, releasing their early records through the label, they switched over to Atlantic in 1993, with Recipe for Hate being their first record outside of the label. Brett Gurewitz is thought to have left Bad Religion as a result of internal disputes, but actually left the band in 1994 so he could run Epitaph full-time. That year Bad Religion and Epitaph received widespread fame, both within and outside the punk community, when Bad Religion (even though they had left Epitaph by this time), NOFX, Rancid and The Offspring all released hit records. This was a big year for punk in the mainstream; Rancid appeared on Saturday Night Live the following year, playing "Ruby Soho" and "Roots Radicals". The Offspring eventually left for Columbia Records in a contract dispute, but their album Smash became the best-selling independent album of all time, with more than 11 million units sold worldwide to date.

Change in style (2000s)
In 2001, Brett Gurewitz returned to Bad Religion, and the band returned to Epitaph Records, releasing seven more albums, the latest being Age of Unreason (2019).

In mid-2005 Epitaph was added to the official list of RIAA members along with several other high-profile independent labels. The reason for the listing is not clear, but one source points to an agreement for internet P2P distribution. Another source claims label management joined RIAA to get certified sales awards (i.e., official "Gold" or "Platinum" record status) for releases. This sparked some controversy as some feel they should no longer be labeled independent if they are a member of the RIAA. However, the only source that has actually been used for these claims of membership is the official RIAA membership list, which has been disputed. As of this writing, not only is Epitaph listed as an official member but Lookout! Records is once again listed, after being falsely listed before. In addition, Fat Wreck Chords has released statements denying their own involvement in the RIAA, condemning the organization.

During this time, the label started to stray from its traditional punk rock output by signing a number of post-hardcore bands such as The Blackout, Escape The Fate, From First to Last, Hell Is for Heroes, I Am Ghost, Matchbook Romance, Our Last Night, Scatter the Ashes, Story of the Year, Thursday, Vanna, and You Me at Six.

Recent years (2010s)
Epitaph signed Weezer in 2010, the label releasing Hurley later that year. The label signed Social Distortion in the same year. Epitaph signed Australian punk band Dangerous! in 2011 and released album Teenage Rampage. Epitaph had also signed the Canadian punk rock band Propagandhi. The label has also been more active in signing bands from the emo revival including The Menzingers, Joyce Manor, Pianos Become the Teeth, Defeater, The World Is a Beautiful Place & I Am No Longer Afraid to Die, and Touché Amoré.

Sales certifications
Epitaph has issued two albums that have been certified as platinum or multi-platinum, for sales of over 1 million units, by the Recording Industry Association of America: Smash by The Offspring, which has been certified six-times platinum, and ...And Out Come the Wolves by Rancid, which has been certified platinum.

Seven albums released by the label, or its subsidiaries Hellcat and ANTI-, have been certified gold for sales of 500,000 copies: Ignition by The Offspring, Punk in Drublic by NOFX, Let's Go by Rancid, Orphans: Brawlers, Bawlers & Bastards by Tom Waits, The Drug in Me Is You by Falling in Reverse, The Warrior's Code by Dropkick Murphys and Sempiternal by Bring Me the Horizon.

Notable artists

Current

 Adult Mom
 Alkaline Trio
 The All-American Rejects
 Architects (World ex. Australia, South Africa and New Zealand)
 Bad Religion
 Bad Suns
 Cold Hart
 Converge
 Cover Your Tracks (inactive since 2016)
 Danny Elfman
 Defeater
 Descendents
 Desaparecidos
 Dolo Tonight

 Falling in Reverse
 The Frights
 The Garden
 The Ghost Inside
 Hot Water Music
 Hunny
 Jamie T
 Joyce Manor
 Justin Pierre
 La Dispute
 The Lawrence Arms
 Lil Lotus
 The Linda Lindas
 Mannequin Pussy
 The Menzingers
 Millencolin
 Off With Their Heads
 Parkway Drive (World Ex. Australia & New Zealand)
 Pennywise
 Pianos Become the Teeth
 poptropicaslutz!
 Propagandhi
 Quicksand
 Raised Fist
 Refused
 Remo Drive
 Retox
 Saosin
 Save Face
 SayWeCanFly
 Sleepwave
 Social Distortion
 Soul Glo
 Teenage Wrist
 Thrice
 This Wild Life
 Too Close to Touch
 Touché Amoré
 The World Is a Beautiful Place & I Am No Longer Afraid to Die

Former

 1208 (Disbanded)
 98 Mute (Disbanded)
 59 Times The Pain (Disbanded)
 Agnostic Front
 ALL
 Alesana
 Atmosphere
 Avion Roe (Disbanded)
 Beatsteaks
 Beautiful Bodies (Disbanded)
 Big Talk
 The Blood Brothers (re-releasing old material)
 Bombshell Rocks
 Bob Log III
 The Bouncing Souls (active with Pure Noise Records)
 Bring Me the Horizon (active with Sony Music)
 Burning Heads
 Busdriver (now on Epitaph's sub-label ANTI-)
 The Blackout (Disbanded)
 The Business (Disbanded)
 Circle Jerks
 Claw Hammer (Disbanded)
 Coffin Break (Disbanded)
 The Color of Violence
 The Cramps (Disbanded)
 Culture Abuse (Disbanded)
 Dag Nasty
 Danger Doom (Disbanded)
 Dangerous!
 Daredevils (Disbanded)
 A Day to Remember (one partner release with ADTR Records; distribution only, active with Fueled By Ramen)
 Dead Fucking Last
 Death by Stereo (active with Indecision Records)
 The Distillers
 Division of Laura Lee
 Down By Law
 The Draft (disbanded)
 Dwarves
 Error (Disbanded)
 Escape the Fate (active with Eleven Seven Label Group)
 Every Time I Die (disbanded)
 Eyedea & Abilities (Disbanded)
 Farewell
 Frank Turner (active with Polydor/Xtra Mile)
 Frenzal Rhomb
 From First to Last
 Gallows (re-releasing old material in North America)
 Gas Huffer (Disbanded)
 The Ghost of a Thousand (Disbanded)
 Green Day (re-releasing old material in Europe;)
 Guttermouth
 H2O (active with Bridge Nine Records)
 Heavens (disbanded)
 The Higher (Disbanded)
 Hell Is for Heroes
 The Hives
 Heideroosjes
 Humpers
 I Against I
 I Am Ghost (Disbanded)
 I Killed the Prom Queen (Disbanded)
 Ikara Colt (Disbanded)
 The (International) Noise Conspiracy (disbanded)
 I Set My Friends on Fire
 The Joykiller (Disbanded)
 Wayne Kramer
 L7
 Leathermouth
 Letlive
 Madball
 Matchbook Romance (Disbanded)
 The Matches
 Motion City Soundtrack
 New Found Glory (active with Hopeless Records)
 New Bomb Turks
 Nick Cave and the Bad Seeds
 No Fun at All (Burning Heart Records)
 NOFX (active with Fat Wreck Chords)
 Obey the Brave (Disbanded)
 The Offspring 
 Osker (Disbanded)
 Our Last Night
 Pete Philly and Perquisite (Disbanded)
 The Pietasters
 Poison Idea (Disbanded)
 Pulley
 Rancid (now on Epitaph's sub-label Hellcat Records)
 Randy
 Red Aunts (Disbanded)
 Rich Kids on LSD (Disbanded)
 Ruth Ruth
 Sage Francis (now on Epitaph's sub-label ANTI-)
 Satanic Surfers
 Scatter the Ashes
 Settle
 Set Your Goals
 The Sidekicks (Disbanded)
 Sing It Loud
 Sleeping with Sirens (active with Sumerian Records)
 SNFU (Disbanded)
 Some Girls
 The Sound of Animals Fighting
 The Special Goodness
 Story of the Year
 Straightfaced
 Ten Foot Pole
 Terrorgruppe
 Thelonious Monster
 Thursday
 Total Chaos
 Tricky
 Turbonegro
 U.S. Bombs
 The Vandals (active with Kung Fu Records)
 Vanna (Disbanded)
 Voodoo Glow Skulls (active with Dr. Strange Records)
 The Weakerthans (on hiatus) 
 Weezer (active with Atlantic Records)
 Youth Group (now on Epitaph's sub-label ANTI-)
 You Me at Six (active with BMG Rights Management)
 Zeke

Compilations 

 Punk-O-Rama series
 Unsound series
 How We Rock
 Spirit of the Streets
 Epitaph / Union skate/surf DVD series
 Football Schmootball (1st)
 DC Video (3rd)
 Circle One (5th)
 Out of Print Compilations
 Bored Generation skate/surf enhanced CD-ROM (1996)
 More Songs About Anger, Fear, Sex & Death (1992)
 New Noise (2010)
 New Noise 2 (2011)

See also 
 Epitaph Records discography
 List of record labels
 Hellcat Records
 ANTI-

References

 
Bad Religion
Record labels established in 1980
Record labels established in 1987
1980 establishments in California
1987 establishments in California
Re-established companies
Record labels based in California
American independent record labels
Punk record labels
Hardcore record labels
Alternative rock record labels
American companies established in 1980
American companies established in 1987